Paraparatrechina is a genus of small ants in the subfamily Formicinae. The genus contains 31 species distributed in the tropics of Africa, Asia and Australia.

Distribution and habitat
The genus is restricted to the Paleotropics. Thirteen species are known from the Afrotropical and Malagasy regions, and twenty-five species and subspecies from Asia and Australia, although preliminary study suggests that there are many undescribed species. Very little is known about the biology of Paraparatrechina in the Afrotropical and Malagasy regions. They have been found in a wide range of tropical habitats from rainforests to forest clearings in sifted leaf litter, rotten logs, under stones, and from beating vegetation and fogging samples from the forest canopy.

Taxonomy
Paraparatrechina was first described as a subgenus of Paratrechina by Donisthorpe (1947). LaPolla et al. (2010a) elevated the formerly synonymized subgenus to genus rank based on both morphological and molecular data.

Description
Paraparatrechina are small (typically around 1–2 mm in total length) formicine ants, which often reflect a metallic iridescence (blue, purple and pink hues have been observed) under light microscopy. In darker species, the iridescence tends to be a darker bluish-purple, while lighter colored species either show little iridescence or reflect a more pinkish-purple hue. Paraparatrechina are usually easily distinguishable from other formicine genera by a unique mesosomal setal pattern: two pairs of erect setae on the pronotum, one pair on the mesonotum and one pair on the propodeum. Nylanderia, the genus most likely confused with Paraparatrechina, never possesses a pair of erect setae on the propodeum. The mandibles of Paraparatrechina also possess five teeth, while in Nylanderia six teeth are usually present.

Species

Paraparatrechina albipes (Emery, 1899)
Paraparatrechina brunnella LaPolla, Cheng & Fisher, 2010
Paraparatrechina bufona (Wheeler, 1922)
Paraparatrechina butteli (Forel, 1913)
Paraparatrechina caledonica (Forel, 1902)
Paraparatrechina concinnata LaPolla, Cheng & Fisher, 2010
Paraparatrechina dichroa (Karavaiev, 1933)
Paraparatrechina emarginata (Forel, 1913)
Paraparatrechina foreli (Emery, 1914)
Paraparatrechina glabra (Forel, 1891)
Paraparatrechina gnoma LaPolla, Cheng & Fisher, 2010
Paraparatrechina iridescens (Donisthorpe, 1942)
Paraparatrechina kongming (Terayama, 2009)
Paraparatrechina koningsbergeri (Karavaiev, 1933)
Paraparatrechina lecamopteridis (Donisthorpe, 1941)
Paraparatrechina minutula (Forel, 1901)
Paraparatrechina myops LaPolla, Cheng & Fisher, 2010
Paraparatrechina nana (Santschi, 1928)
Paraparatrechina nettae (Forel, 1911)
Paraparatrechina oceanica (Mann, 1921)
Paraparatrechina ocellatula LaPolla, Cheng & Fisher, 2010
Paraparatrechina opaca (Emery, 1887)
Paraparatrechina oreias LaPolla, Cheng & Fisher, 2010
Paraparatrechina pallida (Donisthorpe, 1947)
Paraparatrechina pusillima (Emery, 1922)
Paraparatrechina sauteri (Forel, 1913)
Paraparatrechina splendida LaPolla, Cheng & Fisher, 2010
Paraparatrechina subtilis (Santschi, 1920)
Paraparatrechina tapinomoides (Forel, 1905)
Paraparatrechina umbranatis LaPolla, Cheng & Fisher, 2010
Paraparatrechina weissi (Santschi, 1910)

References

External links

Formicinae
Ant genera